Leucoblepsis excisa is a moth in the family Drepanidae first described by George Hampson in 1892. It is found in the north-eastern Himalayas, Peninsular Malaysia, Sumatra and Borneo. Records for Taiwan, refer to the species Leucoblepsis taiwanensis.

The wingspan is 22–31 mm. Adults have been recorded in January, March, May and December.

The larvae feed on the leaves of Elaeocarpus sylvestris. Mature larvae curl a leaf tip and fix it with silk to pupates inside.

References

Moths described in 1892
Drepaninae